Cynthia Anne Gust Ahearn (October 17, 1952 – August 31, 2008) was an American echinodermologist and museum specialist at the Smithsonian Institution. She was responsible for the curation of the Smithsonian's extensive collection of echinoderms. An impactful individual in the field of echinodermology, Ahearn identified nearly 300,000 echinoderm specimen lots and had a nearly complete cataloged collection for the National Museum of Natural History Echinodermata. Ahearn was also responsible for several newsletters during her career, as well as the Discovery Cart, a segment on the Discovery Channel's Young Scientist program. In 2005, Ahearn was presented with the Natural History Museum's Public Outreach Award. Ahearn even had an echinoderm named after her in 2007.

Early life 
Ahearn was born in Minneapolis, Minnesota. Ahearn studied at the Dunbarton College of the Holy Cross in Washington, D.C. In 1973, Ahearn initiated her Smithsonian career, working as a museum specialist.

Career 
After two decades of working at the Smithsonian, Ahearn was the editor, writer, and assembler of the International Echinoderm Newsletter from 1993 to 2003, as well as the editor of the Virtual Echinoderm Newsletter. Ahearn also cataloged nearly the entire collection of Echinodermata for the NMNH. Ahearn initiated the Discovery Cart program on the Discovery Channel and was presented with the National History Museum's Public Outreach Award. Ahearn was also known to give tours to all generations of students. She hosted international visitors to the Smithsonian Institution from many countries, and provided her taxonomic acumen to help salient scientific institutions. Among these are Woods Hole Oceanographic Institution, the National Marine Fisheries Service, New Zealand's National Institute of Water and Atmospheric Research (Wellington), the California Academy of Sciences (in San Francisco, California), the Museum of Comparative Zoology, the Museums Victoria (in Melbourne, Australia).

Death 
Around the time of her death, Ahearn had been doing research on shallow water, deep water, and Antarctic sea cucumbers. Ahearn was survived by her husband, John Ahearn and her daughter Tracey.

Publications 
Ahearn published many noteworthy works, including:

References

1952 births
2008 deaths
American curators
American women curators
Smithsonian Institution people
20th-century American women writers
21st-century American women writers
20th-century American non-fiction writers